Saloni Gaur, alternately known by her comic name Nazma Aapi is a contemporary Indian comedian and impressionist. She addresses social issues through her comic videos.

Biography
She completed an undergraduate degree from the Delhi University in political science and economics.

Saloni started her comic career by the character of "Pinky Dogra" and later used the characters of "Kusum Behenji" and "Asha Behenji". She created the "Nazma Aapi" character in 2018 to address contemporary social issues. She uses Instagram and Twitter as the platforms to reach out to people. She has produced videos on the Citizenship Amendment Act, pollution in Delhi and the Union Budget 2020.

In November 2020, Saloni landed her own show Uncommon Sense With Saloni on the OTT platform Sony Liv.

Filmography

Television

References

External links
 

Living people
1999 births
People from Bulandshahr
Indian women comedians
Indian television actresses
Delhi University alumni